Samuel or Samantha or Sam Collins may refer to:

Samuel Collins (theologian) (1576–1651), English clergyman and academic
Samuel Collins (physician, born 1617) (1617–1685), English physician
Samuel Collins (physician, born 1618) (1618–1710), English anatomist and physician 
Samuel Collins (physician, born 1619) (1619–1670), English physician
Samuel Collins (artist) (1735–1768), British artist
Samuel W. Collins (1802–1870), American axe manufacturer
Sam Collins (music hall) (1825–1865), English music hall comedian and proprietor
Sam Collins (musician) (1887–1949), American blues singer and guitarist
Sam L. Collins (1895–1965), American politician
Samuel Collins (physicist) (1898–1984), physicist at MIT
Samuel Collins (politician) (1923–2012), American lawyer, jurist and politician from Maine
Sam Forse Collins (1928–2021), member of the Texas House of Representatives
Sam Collins (footballer, born 1977), English professional footballer
Sam Collins (chess player) (born 1982), Irish chess player
Sam Collins (footballer, born 1989), English professional footballer
Sam Collins (Australian footballer) (born 1994), Australian rules footballer for Gold Coast, formerly for Fremantle

See also
Sam Collins Day, public holiday
Sammy Collins (1923–1998), English footballer